The Buena Vista Ferry connects Marion County and Polk County across the Willamette River in the U.S. state of Oregon. It is located a few miles south of Independence, near the community of Buena Vista. The river is approximately 720 feet (220 m) wide at the crossing. The cable ferry has a capacity of six vehicles.

The ferry is open 7 a.m. to 5:30 p.m., seven days a week.

Buena Vista Ferry is electrically powered with three-phase AC with a frequency of 60 Hertz and a voltage of 480 volts. The power is delivered by a three-conductor overhead wire .

History
In 2011, the ferry was replaced with a new one paid for in part by federal stimulus funds.  The new vessel allows the ferry to operate year-round; formerly it only ran from April to October.

See also

Canby Ferry and Wheatland Ferry are the state's other two ferries across the Willamette River.

 Historic ferries in Oregon

References

External links
 Buena Vista Ferry information from Marion County
 Historic photos of Buena Vista Ferry from Salem Public Library

Ferries of Oregon
Transportation in Marion County, Oregon
Crossings of the Willamette River
Transportation in Polk County, Oregon
Cable ferries in the United States
Trolley ferries